Nentershausen is an Ortsgemeinde – a community belonging to a Verbandsgemeinde – in the Westerwaldkreis in Rhineland-Palatinate, Germany.

Geography

Location
The community lies in the Westerwald between Limburg an der Lahn and Montabaur on the edge of the Nassau Nature Park. The community belongs to the Verbandsgemeinde of Montabaur, a kind of collective municipality. Its seat is in the like-named town.

Neighbouring communities
Nentershausen's immediate neighbours are Eppenrod, Kleinholbach, Görgeshausen, Heilberscheid, Niedererbach and Nomborn.

History
In 841, Nentershausen had its first documentary mention.

Politics

Community council
The council is made up of 13 council members, including the extraofficial mayor (Bürgermeister), who were elected in a municipal election on 13 June 2004.

Coat of arms
The community's arms are formed out of its three court seals. Nentershausen, which came from the hereditary holdings of the Counts of Diez, was finally passed to the Electorate of Trier in 1564. The joint Trier-Nassau overlordship first worked out the Treaty of Diez of 1564. The Diez lion and the Trier cross display this collective political fate. The cloverleaves are taken as a special local Nentershausen emblem.

Partnerships
 Vieux-Berquin, Nord, France

Culture and sightseeing

Buildings
 
 Kirche St. Laurentius, (church) built in 1863.
 Bürgerhaus 2005 (community centre)
 Sport- und Veranstaltungshalle Freiherr-vom-Stein-Halle 1985 (sport and event hall)
 Regionalschule 1975 and Grundschule 1998 (regional and primary schools)
 Feuerwehrhaus (1990) (fire station)

Regular events
A kermis is held on the second weekend in August.

Economy and infrastructure
Important employers are businesses in filling station building, container and machine building, transport technology, building materials (roofing cardboard), plastic processing, Fördertechnik beside crafting operations from construction side industries.

Many of those in the workforce commute to Limburg, Frankfurt, Montabaur or Koblenz.

Transport
The nearest Autobahn interchange is Diez on the A 3 (Cologne–Frankfurt), about 1 km away. InterCityExpress connections are to be had through the railway station at Limburg and Montabaur on the Cologne-Frankfurt high-speed rail line, each just under 12 km away on the A 3. There are local public transport connections to Montabaur, Diez, Limburg and Koblenz, and well marked hiking paths around the community.

Education
Kindergarten, primary and regional schools; secondary andvocational schools in Montabaur, Diez and Limburg.

References

Further reading
Chronik Nentershausen 2000 edition

External links
Nentershausen-Westerwald 

Municipalities in Rhineland-Palatinate
Westerwaldkreis